Bogislaw X of Pomerania, the Great, (3 June 1454 – 5 October 1523) was Duke of Pomerania from 1474 until his death in 1523.

Biography
Bogislaw was born in Rügenwalde (now Darłowo, Poland). His parents were Eric II, Duke of Pomerania-Wolgast, and Sophia of Pomerania, both members of the House of Pomerania . Bogislaw was first married to Margaret of Brandenburg and later to Anna, daughter of the Polish king Casimir IV Jagiellon. With his second wife he had eight children, including Sophia, who became queen of Denmark. He inherited all of the previously partitioned Duchy of Pomerania and became its sole ruler in 1478. He was succeeded by his sons George I and Barnim XI.

Before Bogislaw's reign, the Duchy of Pomerania had for a long time been divided into several splinter duchies, ruled by relatives of the Griffin house. In 1464, Pomerania-Stettin's duke Otto III died without an heir, Bogislaw's father Eric II and his uncle, Wartislaw X, both ruling different portions of Pomerania-Wolgast, managed to succeed in a conflict about Pomerania-Stettin inheritance with the Margraviate of Brandenburg. In 1474, with his father's death, Bogislaw inherited his  splinter duchy, becoming Duke of Pomerania. In 1478 with his uncle's death, he also inherited his splinter duchy, Pomerania-Barth, becoming the first sole ruler in the Duchy of Pomerania since about 200 years.

His father, Eric II, had left Pomerania in tense conflicts with Brandenburg and Mecklenburg. Bogislaw managed to resolve these conflicts by both diplomatic and military means. He married his sister, Sophia, to Magnus II, Duke of Mecklenburg, and his other sister, Margarete, was married to Magnus's brother Balthasar. Bogislaw himself married Margarete, daughter of Brandenburg's Prince-elector Frederick II. Also, in 1478, Bogislaw regained areas lost to Brandenburg by his father, most notably the town of Gartz and other small towns and castles north of the Brandenburgian Uckermark. He confirmed the 1472 Peace of Prenzlau in 1479, leaving Strasburg with Brandenburg and Bogislaw had to take his possessions as a fief from Brandenburg. In the same year, his wife died before they had children.

When Bogislaw married Anna of Poland in 1491, all of Pomerania's neighbors were tied to the House of Pomerania by marriage. Bogislaw made use of these favourable conditions in 1493, and strengthened Pomerania's position towards Brandenburg in the Treaty of Pyritz, which declared Pomerania not a fief of Brandenburg, but a fief of the Holy Roman Emperor.

In 1496–98, Bogislaw travelled to Jerusalem as a pilgrim. He died in Stettin.

Children

by Anna Jagiellon:
 Kasimir VIII (28 April 1494 –  29 October 1518)
 Sophie of Pomerania, Queen of Denmark (1498–1568), married Frederick I of Denmark in 1525
 George I, Duke of Pomerania (1493–1531)
 Anna of Pomerania, Duchess of Lubin (1492–1550), married George I of Brieg in 1521
 Barnim IX, Duke of Pomerania (1501–1573)
 Elisabeth (died before 1518), abbess of Krummin Nunnery
 Barnim (before 1501 – before 1501)
 Otto (before 1503 – before 1518)

illegitimate:
 Christoph, archdeacon of Usedom as of 1508

Ancestors

Sources
 

1454 births
1523 deaths
People from Darłowo
Dukes of Pomerania